Tetrachondraceae is a plant family in the order Lamiales. The family contains the two genera Polypremum and Tetrachondra, which together comprise the three species:
 Polypremum procumbens  – juniper leaf or rustweed
 Tetrachondra hamiltonii 
 Tetrachondra patagonica

References

Lamiales
Lamiales families